John W. Danner (born August 18, 1966) is an American entrepreneur who founded NetGravity, Rocketship Education, Zeal Learning, and Dunce Capital.  He is currently the Managing Partner of Dunce Capital, which invests in the future of learning and work.  He was the Co-Founder of Rocketship Education, where he served as CEO from 2006 to 2013. He cofounded NetGravity in 1995, which was the world's first advertising server company.

Education and career 
Danner received his Bachelor’s of Science in Electrical Engineering from Stanford University in 1988. He went on to receive his Master’s of Science from Stanford in Electrical Engineering in 1992 while working as a Software Engineer at Oracle Corporation.

After receiving his bachelor's degree, Danner started his career as a Software Engineer at Tandem Computers, where he remained from June 1988 to June 1990. At Tandem, he built the front-end for Tandem’s design environment as well as CAD tools used by Tandem to make new computers.
Following his tenure at Tandem, Danner worked as a Software Engineer at Oracle Corporation. After Oracle, Danner went on to work at Silicon Graphics, where he worked as a Software Engineer on Jim Clark's project to build the Nintendo64 and Time Warner fiber to the curb project (Full Service Network).

In August 1995, Danner co-founded NetGravity, where he served as CEO until August 1999. NetGravity was the first ad server company. It made software that helped large media companies and websites manage Internet advertising. The company had an initial public offering in June 1998 and was sold to DoubleClick in 1999 for $750 million.

After the sale of NetGravity, Danner went on to continue his studies and started a Master’s of Education in Education Policy in 2001 at Vanderbilt University. He finished the degree in 2002. After receiving his degree from Vanderbilt, Danner went on to work as a public school teacher in Nashville, Tennessee from 2002 to 2005.

In 2006, Danner co-founded Rocketship Education, where he served as CEO from 2005 to 2013. Rocketship combined classroom and online teaching and at the time of Danner’s departure, the company served 3,500 students across 7 schools and was the highest-performing low-income school system in California.

In February 2013, Danner co-founded Zeal Learning. Zeal Learning was an online math tutoring company. By combining live coaches and machine learning, Zeal reduced the cost of math tutoring, effectively solving Bloom's Two Sigma Problem.

Danner sold Zeal in 2018 and began actively angel investing.  At the end of 2018, he started a venture capital fund, Dunce Capital, focused on idea and pre-seed investments in the future of learning and work (FLW).

See also 
DreamBox (company)

References 

Stanford University alumni
1966 births
Living people
Henry Crown Fellows